Nigilgia superbella is a moth in the family Brachodidae. It was described by Rebel in 1907. It is known from Yemen, Saudi Arabia and the United Arab Emirates.

The larvae feed on Ficus species.

References

Natural History Museum Lepidoptera generic names catalog

Brachodidae
Moths described in 1907